Ilaria Cucchi (born 22 June 1974) is an Italian human rights activist and politician.

She has campaigned for investigation of the death in police custody of her brother, . In 2013 she was an unsuccessful candidate in elections for the national parliament with "Rivoluzione Civile - Lista Ingroia". The street artist Jorit Agoch painted a mural portrait of her in via Verrotti all'Arenella, Naples, in 2018. After 2022 Italian general elections, she became a member of the Senate for the centre-left coalition.

References

See also
On My Skin (2018 film)

1974 births
Living people
Italian activists
Italian Left politicians